Sharon Lynn Webb (born in Tampa, Florida on February 29, 1936; died in Blairsville, Georgia on April 29, 2010) was a science fiction writer and nurse.

Biography
Born on Tampa, Florida on February 29, 1936, Sharon Lynn Webb began her career as a published author when one of her poems was published in a 1963 edition of The Magazine of Fantasy & Science Fiction. Frequently writing under the pseudonym "Ron Webb" during the early part of her career, her work increased in frequency under her given name by 1979. Her works often concerned medical issues or advances in medicine. Along with science fiction she also wrote medically-oriented thrillers. Webb suffered a heart attack, and died in Blairsville, Georgia on April 29, 2010.

Selected works
Earth Song trilogy 
Earthchild (1982)
Earth Song (1983)
Ram Song (1984)
The Adventures of Terra Tarkington (1985) (fixup)
R.N. (1985)
The Thing That Goes Burp in the Night (1986) short story
Pestis 18 (1987)
The Half Life (1989)

References

Sources
The Encyclopedia of Science Fiction, pg 1307

External links

Sharon Webb at The Encyclopedia of Science Fiction, 3rd edition (draft)
The Adventures of Terra Tarkington review.

1936 births
2010 deaths
American nurses
American women nurses
Medical fiction writers
People from Tampa, Florida
People from Blairsville, Georgia
American women novelists
20th-century American novelists
20th-century American women writers
American science fiction writers
Women science fiction and fantasy writers
21st-century American women